Sar Rig (also Romanized as Sar Rīg, Sarīg, and Sarrīg) is a village in Dulab Rural District, Shahab District, Qeshm County, Hormozgan Province, Iran. At the 2006 census, its population was 1,498, in 329 families.

References 

Populated places in Qeshm County